Vilela is a Portuguese Freguesia in the Municipality of Póvoa de Lanhoso, with an area of 4.18 km2 and 615 inhabitants (2011). The Freguesia has a population density of 147.1 people per km2.

Population

References 

Freguesias of Póvoa de Lanhoso